The second competition weekend of the 2008–09 ISU Speed Skating World Cup was held in Thialf in Heerenveen, Netherlands, from Friday, 14 November, until Sunday, 16 November 2008.

Schedule of events
Schedule of the event:

Medal summary

Men's events

Women's events

References

2
Isu World Cup, 2008-09, 2
ISU Speed Skating World Cup, 2008-09, World Cup 2